The South African Railways Class Experimental 5 2-8-2 of 1906 was a steam locomotive from the pre-Union era in the Cape of Good Hope.

In 1906, the Cape Government Railways placed a single experimental  steam locomotive with a  Mikado type wheel arrangement in service. In 1912, when this locomotive was assimilated into the South African Railways, it was renumbered and designated Class Experimental 5. The design was never repeated.

Manufacturer
The Cape 9th Class Mikado type steam locomotive was designed by H.M. Beatty, the Locomotive Superintendent of the Cape Government Railways (CGR) from 1896 to 1910. It was a larger version of his 9th Class of 1903, which was also built with a bar frame and Stephenson’s Link valve gear and which also used saturated steam. The locomotive was delivered with a Type XF2 tender by Kitson and Company in 1906 and was numbered 840.

Characteristics
At the time, the locomotive was considered as a big advance in motive power. It was a large engine and on the CGR it was exceeded in size only by the experimental Kitson-Meyer 0-6-0+0-6-0 locomotive which had entered service in 1903.

The locomotive was larger than its predecessor 9th Class of 1903 in all respects, with a longer boiler which had a bigger girth, larger diameter pistons with a longer stroke, larger diameter driving wheels, a larger firebox, and a tender with a larger fuel and water capacity. The design was, however, never repeated and the Cape 9th Class Mikado remained unique.

Service

Cape Government Railways
The locomotive was placed in service on the Western System, working on the mainline between Touws River and Prince Albert Road in the Karoo. When it was determined by the Civil Department of the CGR that the engine was too heavy for the rails and bridges on this section, it was transferred to the section between Beaufort West and De Aar where heavier rail was in use.

South African Railways
When the Union of South Africa was established on 31 May 1910, the three Colonial government railways (CGR, Natal Government Railways and Central South African Railways) were united under a single administration to control and administer the railways, ports and harbours of the Union. Although the South African Railways and Harbours came into existence in 1910, the actual classification and renumbering of all the rolling stock of the three constituent railways were only implemented with effect from 1 January 1912.

In 1912, the locomotive was designated Class Experimental 5 and renumbered to 948 on the South African Railways. It was later transferred to Braamfontein, where it remained until it was withdrawn from service and scrapped in 1929.

References

2140
2140
2140
2-8-2 locomotives
1D1 locomotives
Kitson locomotives
Cape gauge railway locomotives
Railway locomotives introduced in 1906
1906 in South Africa
Scrapped locomotives